John O'Driscoll (born 26 November 1952) is an Irish former rugby union player. He was educated at Stonyhurst College and is a former  international rugby union player winning 26 caps. He toured South Africa in 1980 and New Zealand in 1983 with the British and Irish Lions and at the time played club rugby for London Irish. O'Driscoll captained the London Irish team that reached the final of the 1980 John Player Cup.

He played for Connacht at Inter-Provincial level. His older brother Barry O'Driscoll was also capped for Ireland. Lions captain Brian O'Driscoll is nephew to the brothers. The family is not related to Mick O'Driscoll, who also played rugby union for Ireland.

References

1953 births
Living people
Connacht Rugby players
Irish rugby union players
Ireland international rugby union players
London Irish players
British & Irish Lions rugby union players from Ireland
Rugby union flankers
People educated at Stonyhurst College
Place of birth missing (living people)
John
Irish Exiles non-playing staff
Manchester Rugby Club players
Irish expatriate rugby union players
Expatriate rugby union players in England
Irish expatriate sportspeople in England
Rugby union players from County Dublin